Gundibail Rama Sunderam  (29 March 1930 – 20 June 2010) was a former Indian cricketer who played in two Test matches in 1955.

G.R. Sunderam was a right arm fast medium bowler and a right hand batsman. He underwent training in the cricket school run by Alf Gover in 1953. He represented India in the unofficial 'Test' against the Silver Jubilee Overseas Cricket team later that year before appearing in Ranji matches.

His two Test matches were against New Zealand in 1955–56. He took one of the two wickets when New Zealand made 450 for 2 in the Delhi Test and two more wickets in the next one. But the presence of medium pacers like G. S. Ramchand and Dattu Phadkar, who were much better batsmen, limited his  chances.

Sunderam represented Bombay and Rajasthan in the Ranji Trophy. His son Pradeep Sunderam opened the bowling for Rajasthan in the 1980s and once took 10 wickets in an innings.

Sunderam was born to a Billava (Poojary) family in Udipi in Southern Karnataka .

Sunderam died 20 June 2010 in Mumbai aged 80.

References

External links

1930 births
2010 deaths
India Test cricketers
Indian cricketers
Central Zone cricketers
Mumbai cricketers
Rajasthan cricketers
Indian Universities cricketers
People from Udupi
Mangaloreans
Tulu people
Cricketers from Karnataka